The Superstition Hills are a low mountain range in the Colorado Desert, in western Imperial County, southern California.

They are located southwest of the Salton Sea, in the Lower Colorado River Valley.

See also 
1987 Superstition Hills earthquakes

References 

Mountain ranges of the Colorado Desert
Mountain ranges of Imperial County, California
Mountain ranges of the Lower Colorado River Valley